Moazzam Malik (born 3 October 1994) is a Pakistani cricketer. He made his first-class debut for Karachi Whites in the 2017–18 Quaid-e-Azam Trophy on 2 November 2017. He made his List A debut for Karachi Whites in the 2018–19 Quaid-e-Azam One Day Cup on 24 October 2018.

References

External links
 

1994 births
Living people
Pakistani cricketers
Place of birth missing (living people)
Karachi Whites cricketers